Filinskaya is a rural locality (a village) in Nizhne-Vazhskoye Rural Settlement, Verkhovazhsky District, Vologda Oblast, Russia. The population was 13 as of 2002.

Geography 
The distance to Verkhovazhye is 15.1 km, to Kukolovskaya is 3 km. Frolovskaya, Gorka, Klykovo, Pakhomovskaya are the nearest rural localities.

References 

Rural localities in Verkhovazhsky District